Das kleine und das große Glück is an East German film directed by Martin Hellberg. It was released in 1953.

Cast
In alphabetical order
 Bruno Atlas-Eising
 Ilse Bastubbe
 Helmut Bautzmann
 Werner Berndt as  Gustl
 Fritz Bogdon
 Johanna Bucher as  Hannchen
 Werner Buttler
 Hansjoachim Büttner as  Stockberger
 Fritz Decho as Gotthold
 Heinz Dhein
 Jens-Peter Dierichs
 Otto Dierichs as Direktor der Bau-Union
 Susanne Düllmann as Erika Brandt
 Edgar Engelmann as Volkspolizist
 Rudolf Fleck as Karrer

External links
 

1953 films
East German films
1950s German-language films
German black-and-white films
1950s German films